Daniel Warden (born 11 April 1973) is an English former professional footballer who played as a midfielder in the Football League.

References

1973 births
Living people
English footballers
Association football midfielders
Footballers from Stepney
Charlton Athletic F.C. players
English Football League players